CINEMQ is a queer cinema collective and LGBT film festival held in Shanghai, China. CINEMQ was first established in 2015.

Other festivals 
CINEMQ is one of three unconnected LGBT film festivals in Shanghai. The second LGBT film festival is the Shanghai Queer Film Festival, which launched in September 2017, and is a volunteer-run, not-for-profit event that aims to help facilitate and promote the work of filmmakers from Chinese and other Asian backgrounds. The third is the ShanghaiPRIDE Film Festival which launched in 2015 and is a subdivision of ShanghaiPRIDE, an annual LGBT pride event.

History 
CINEMQ is a volunteer-led, not-for-profit collective engaged in queer cultural activism through film and screen culture in Mainland China. Their main activities include a thematic queer film screening and party series - which are described as a "mix tape of short films, visuals and music". They screen films that are "queer, or concerned with issues of gender or non-heterosexualities". Drawing on film submissions and other sources, they take an experimental approach to film programming that "highlights or challenges" concepts relevant to the local queer community, challenging "a diverse audience on how they think about issues of gender and sexuality in life and in media".

Due to government restrictions, CINEMQ and other LGBT film festivals in China play primarily in underground spaces. They have also screened films in Beijing and London.

Unlike the city's other film festivals, which work in collaboration with foreign consulates and corporate sponsors, CINEMQ is more closely aligned with Shanghai's underground arts scene and youth culture. According to organizer Will Dai, "Queerness is very much entangled with youth culture in Shanghai. There's a fluidity within these sub-cultural groups that see gender and sexuality explored and sometimes dismantled through fashion, music, and art." Youth culture's experimentation with sexuality and gender in China is, according to de Kloet and Fung, a reaction to the dominance of heterosexual-patriarchal discourses in China. They identify youth engagement in queer culture(s) as an act of disruption. "A lot of young people are catching up to this idea of being free and expressive of their individuality. To us, I think that’s the essence of being queer," Dai states. "CINEMQ's content can be seen as political, but since we’re pushing it through culture and cinema it might not seem as confrontational – it’s soft power."

CINEMQ was established in 2015 by Matthew Baren and Alvin Li. The collective was originally launched as a creative crowd-building initiative for ShanghaiPRIDE Film Festival. The aim was to broaden the reach of ShanghaiPRIDE to better represent local diversity. According to Baren, "whilst Pride is a great organization which does a lot for the community, there are a lot of people who aren’t reached by their events or who don’t feel represented by them. Our idea was to create a space for fringe queers, people of non-distinct sexuality or gender, for people who wanted to be challenged by what they saw on a night out whilst still having fun."

In 2017 CINEMQ ended its association with ShanghaiPRIDE. They expanded their operation to publish a bilingual online magazine through Chinese social media platform WeChat and covering queer cinema and screen culture, with a focus on China and East Asia.

In 2019 CINEMQ partnered with London-based 'Queer' Asia to co-present their annual film festival. The 11-day event saw film screenings and discussions hosted at venues including British Museum, SOAS University of London, King’s College London and the University of Warwick.

See also 
 List of LGBT film festivals

References

Film festivals established in 2015
Film festivals in China
LGBT film festivals in China
LGBT culture in Shanghai
2015 establishments in China